The term French Louisiana refers to two distinct regions:
 first, to colonial French Louisiana, comprising the massive, middle section of North America claimed by France during the 17th and 18th centuries; and,
 second, to modern French Louisiana, which stretches across the southern extreme of the present-day State of Louisiana.

Each term has been in use for many years.

Colonial French Louisiana

Colonial French Louisiana was a part of New France.  Beginning in 1682 this region, known in French as la Louisiane française, functioned as an administrative district of New France.  It extended from the Gulf of Mexico to Vincennes, now in Indiana.  France ceded the region to Spain and Britain in 1763 after the French and Indian War, regained it by treaty in 1800, and sold it to the United States in 1803 through the Louisiana Purchase.

Modern French Louisiana

Greater New Orleans and the twenty-two parish cultural region known as Acadiana compose present-day French Louisiana. Although the Louisiana French (Cajuns & Creoles) dominate south Louisiana's cultural landscape, other important ethnic groups in the region include African-Americans, Native Americans, Isleños, German Coast settlers and various immigrant groups, including Vietnamese, Laotians, Filipinos and a growing number of Hispanics.  In addition, some French Louisiana influences can be found in cities adjacent to the region, such as Alexandria and Baton Rouge.

See also

Louisiana (New France)
List of French possessions and colonies

Notes

 

Acadiana
French-American culture in Louisiana